Erythrocyte membrane protein band 4.2 is a protein that in humans is encoded by the EPB42 gene. It is part of the red blood cell cytoskeleton.

Erythrocyte membrane protein band 4.2 is an ATP-binding protein which may regulate the association of band 3 with ankyrin. It probably has a role in erythrocyte shape and mechanical property regulation. Mutations in the EPB42 gene are associated with recessive spherocytic elliptocytosis and recessively transmitted hereditary hemolytic anemia.

See also
 Hereditary elliptocytosis

References

Further reading

External links